Broken Valley is the fourth studio album by American alternative metal band Life of Agony, released on June 14, 2005 by Epic Records. It is the band's first album in eight years, following 1997's  Soul Searching Sun, and first with the band's classic, original line-up since Ugly in 1995. Epic Records elected not to issue Broken Valley in the United Kingdom upon release. However, the album was eventually released in the UK on October 17, 2005 through Sony BMG Music Entertainment under exclusive UK license to Hassle Records. The Hassle Records' limited edition included a special, bonus DVD along with a previously unreleased, bonus track from the Broken Valley recording sessions.

Commercial performance 
Broken Valley debuted at number 147 on the Billboard 200, selling 7,689 copies in its first week. However, the album quickly fell off the charts, and by December 2005 it had only sold 28,000 copies in the US.

The album's sales in the US were also damaged by the Sony BMG copy protection rootkit scandal, and was one of the affected albums selected for recall from retailers in November 2005.

Track listing

Bonus DVD 
Several versions of the album were accompanied by a DVD, in which the band discussed their break-up and why they got back together.

The DVD includes several easter eggs such as a studio rehearsal of "Junk Sick" and backstage footage.

Personnel 
Life of Agony
 Mina Caputo – lead vocals
 Joey Z. – guitar, backing vocals
 Alan Robert – bass, backing vocals, cover design
 Sal Abruscato – drums

Additional
 Greg Fidelman – producer
 Tony Zeller – engineer
 Johnny Fairfax – engineer
 Kevin Dean – engineer
 Ted Jensen – mastering
 Myriam Santos-Kayda – photography

Footnotes 

Life of Agony albums
2005 albums
Epic Records albums
Albums produced by Greg Fidelman